Chloroclystis polygraphata is a moth in the family Geometridae. It was described by George Hampson in 1912. It is endemic to Sri Lanka.

References

Moths described in 1912
polygraphata
Endemic fauna of Sri Lanka
Taxa named by George Hampson